Guido Schumacher (born 14 December 1965) is a German judoka. He competed in the men's half-lightweight event at the 1988 Summer Olympics.

References

External links
 

1965 births
Living people
German male judoka
Olympic judoka of West Germany
Judoka at the 1988 Summer Olympics
People from Rheinisch-Bergischer Kreis
Sportspeople from Cologne (region)